Manchester is a town in Meriwether and Talbot counties in the U.S. state of Georgia, although primarily in Meriwether. The population was 3,584 at the 2020 census, down from 4,230 in 2010. It is the most populous community in Meriwether County. CSX Transportation runs a railroad yard in Manchester.

History
Manchester was founded in 1907, when the Atlanta, Birmingham and Atlantic Railway was extended northward to that point; it was merged into the Atlantic Coast Line Railroad in 1946. From Manchester the railroad diverged, with one line going to Atlanta and another to Birmingham. The Georgia General Assembly incorporated Manchester as a city in 1909. The city was named after Manchester, in England.

In 2019, CSX Transportation demolished the historic Manchester Yard Office in order to make way for a new, larger, yard facilities building.

Geography
Manchester is in west central Georgia, in southern Meriwether County, with a small portion extending south into Talbot County. Georgia State Route 85 is the main highway through the city, leading southwest  to Columbus and north  to Woodbury. Georgia 85 meets Georgia 190 in the southern part of the city, which leads west  along the crest of Pine Mountain to U.S. Route 27 south of the town of Pine Mountain. Georgia 85 meets Georgia 41 in the center of Manchester, which leads southeast  to Woodland and northwest  to Warm Springs.

Pigeon Creek runs along the northern border of the city and flows east to the Flint River.

Demographics

2020 census

As of the 2020 United States census, there were 3,584 people, 1,494 households, and 1,056 families residing in the city.

2000 census
As of the census of 2000, there were 3,769 people, 1,629 households, and 1,057 families residing in the city. The racial makeup of the city was 56.22% White, 42.23% African American, 0.33% Native American, 0.65% Asian, 0.10% from other races, and 0.48% from two or more races. Hispanic or Latino of any race were 0.70% of the population.

There were 1,629 households, out of which 28.7% had children under the age of 18 living with them, 39.5% were married couples living together, 21.4% had a female householder with no husband present, and 35.1% were non-families. 31.4% of all households were made up of individuals, and 14.5% had someone living alone who was 65 years of age or older.  The average household size was 2.45 and the average family size was 3.09.

In the city, the population was spread out, with 27.9% under the age of 18, 8.6% from 18 to 24, 25.4% from 25 to 44, 21.7% from 45 to 64, and 16.4% who were 65 years of age or older.  The median age was 37 years. For every 100 females, there were 82.3 males.  For every 100 females age 18 and over, there were 75.0 males.

The median income for a household in the city was $23,983, and the median income for a family was $31,988. Males had a median income of $25,942 versus $21,484 for females. The per capita income for the city was $16,130.  About 17.8% of families and 25.0% of the population were below the poverty line, including 37.0% of those under age 18 and 13.7% of those age 65 or over.

Notable people
 David "Swagg R'Celious" Harris, A Grammy and Emmy award winning and four time Grammy nominated producer and songwriter.The first person and first person of color to achieve these accolades from the city.
 Bill Mathis, former Clemson and Super Bowl-winning New York Jets football player
 Stuart Woods, novelist. Manchester, dubbed Delano, was the setting for his first best-seller, Chiefs, and most of his subsequent books have a character who comes from the city.

References

External links

Cities in Georgia (U.S. state)
Cities in Meriwether County, Georgia
Cities in Talbot County, Georgia